Benedict Wong (born 3 July 1971) is a British actor. He is known for his roles as Kublai Khan in Netflix's Marco Polo (2014–2016), Bruce Ng in The Martian (2015), and Wong in the Marvel Cinematic Universe since Doctor Strange (2016).

Early life
Wong was born on 3 July 1971 in Eccles, Lancashire, the son of Hong Kong immigrant parents who had travelled through Ireland before settling in England. He was brought up in Eccles, and attended Salford City College (then called De La Salle Sixth Form College) in the surrounding area of Salford. He then took a two-year performing arts course at Salford City College.

Career
Wong's first role was in a 1993 BBC Radio play called Kai Mei Sauce, written by his cousin, Kevin Wong. He appeared as Errol Spears alongside Sean Lock in the situation comedy 15 Storeys High, and as Franklin Fu in the second series of Look Around You. In 2003, he was nominated at the British Independent Film Awards for Best Supporting Actor for his role as Guo Yi in Dirty Pretty Things.

In 2007, Wong starred in the feature film Grow Your Own. Wong went on to appear in the second episode of Series 4 of the Channel 4 comedy The IT Crowd, playing the character Prime, a previous Countdown contestant who had won the sixteenth Countdown teapot when he was known as Harold Tong. Wong also appeared in the film Shanghai playing the character Juso Kita and the BBC series Spirit Warriors in the role of Li.

In 2012, Wong appeared in the Ridley Scott film Prometheus as the ship's pilot, Ravel. In 2013, Wong was cast in the lead role of #aww: The Arrest of Ai WeiWei at the Hampstead Theatre. Shortly after, the Almeida Theatre announced that Wong had joined the cast of the play Chimerica as Zhang Lin. Also in 2013, Wong played the role of gangster Lau in the BBC Two comedy-drama The Wrong Mans. He was nominated for the West End Frame Award for Best Dramatic Performance for his role in Chimerica.

In 2013, Wong played the role of former Chinese contemporary artist Ai WeiWei in a political play called #aiww: The Arrest of Ai Weiwei adapted from Ai's account in Barnaby Martin's Book "The Hanging Man".

In 2014, Wong played the role of Kublai Khan in the Netflix series Marco Polo, which on 7 January 2015 was renewed by Netflix for a 10-episode second series.

The next year, he appeared in another Ridley Scott science fiction film, playing the director of the Jet Propulsion Lab, Bruce Ng in The Martian. In 2016, he co-starred as Wong in the superhero film Doctor Strange (2016) and later reprised the role in Avengers: Infinity War (2018), Avengers: Endgame (2019), Shang-Chi and the Legend of the Ten Rings (2021), Spider-Man: No Way Home (2021), Doctor Strange in the Multiverse of Madness (2022), and the 2022 Disney+ series She-Hulk: Attorney at Law.

Wong appeared in "Hated in the Nation", an episode of the anthology series Black Mirror, playing Shaun Li, an agent with the National Crime Agency in 2016. In 2017 he voiced the character of Alex Yu in the Arkane Studios game Prey and starred in "2036: Nexus Dawn", a promotional short film prequel to Blade Runner 2049 directed by Luke Scott and co-starring Jared Leto. He appeared as the scientist Lomax in the 2018 science fiction horror film Annihilation.

In 2019, he performed the voice of the Skeksis general skekVar in the Netflix series The Dark Crystal: Age of Resistance and the voice of Bull in the film Lady and the Tramp. In 2020, he appeared as a Necromancer in an episode of the FX television series What We Do in the Shadows. Wong's 2013 political play #aiww: The Arrest of Ai Weiwei was streamed through the news network The Guardian again in May 2020.

In 2021, Wong voiced the warrior giant Tong in the Disney animated film Raya and the Last Dragon. In 2021, he was nominated for a Spirit Award for Best Supporting Male for his performance as Kyo in Nine Days. Wong joined the cast for the Netflix live action adaptation of the Chinese novel The Three Body Problem by Liu Cixin which began shooting later that year. In 2022, through BBC Radio, Wong partnered with Ai WeiWei again, serving as the narrator for Ai's memoir 1000 Years of Joys and Sorrows.

Personal life
Wong is a fan of Manchester United FC.

Filmography

Film

Television

Video games

Theatre

Awards and nominations

See also 
 Kevin Lee (actor)

Notes

References

External links

 

1971 births
Living people
20th-century British male actors
21st-century British male actors
British male film actors
British male stage actors
British male television actors
British male voice actors
British male actors of Chinese descent
British people of Chinese descent
British people of Hong Kong descent
Male actors from Salford
People from Eccles, Greater Manchester